Varzo is a comune (municipality) in the Province of Verbano-Cusio-Ossola in the Italian region Piedmont, located about  northeast of Turin and about  northwest of Verbania, on the border with Switzerland.

Varzo borders the following municipalities: Baceno, Bognanco, Crevoladossola, Crodo, Grengiols (Switzerland), Ried-Brig (Switzerland), Trasquera, Zwischbergen (Switzerland).

Varzo is also known because of the Alpe Veglia Natural Park.

References

External links
 www.comune.varzo.vb.it/
 Alpe Veglia Natural Park

• Chiesa di Varzo http://valdivedro.it/cultura/chiesa-parrocchiale-varzo

Cities and towns in Piedmont